Ben Waterhouse is a British Formula One engineer.  He is currently the head of performance engineering at the Red Bull Racing Formula One team.

Career
Waterhouse studied automotive engineering at Loughborough University but turned to motorsport shortly after graduation. He started at Jaguar Racing in December 2003 as a structural analysis engineer, moving into vehicle dynamics by the time Red Bull Racing came into being. He departed in 2008 for a role with BMW Sauber, and was part of a talented group of vehicle performance engineers such as Loïc Serra and Pierre Waché that oversaw a series of memorable years for the Swiss outfit in which they were particularly good at maximising performance from the Pirelli tyres. In 2013 Waterhouse rose to the position of Head of Vehicle Performance but left the Hinwil-based quad to seek a new challenge as Deputy Technical Director of Scuderia Toro Rosso. He spent three years working at the Faenza team, before returning to Red Bull Racing in 2017, first as Deputy Head of Performance Engineering before stepping up to Head of Performance Engineering in the summer of 2018.

References

1979 births
Living people
21st-century British engineers
Formula One engineers